Russell Hamer (born 1940s) is a former cricketer who played first-class cricket for Sri Lanka from 1968 to 1977.

Russell Hamer attended Wesley College, Colombo, and played cricket for Ceylon Schools in 1964. He played his first match of first-class cricket in the Gopalan Trophy in 1967–68, and made his highest score of 52 in the Gopalan Trophy match in 1970–71.

He was Sri Lanka's main wicket-keeper in the early 1970s. He toured India with the Sri Lankan team in 1975-76 and played in two of the three matches against India. He also played two limited-overs matches for Sri Lanka against touring MCC teams in the 1970s, both of which Sri Lanka won.

In 2017, he was one of the first players to receive financial assistance under a new scheme to help former national players with medical expenses. He had recently suffered a stroke. In September 2018, he was one of 49 former Sri Lankan cricketers felicitated by Sri Lanka Cricket, to honour them for their services before Sri Lanka became a full member of the International Cricket Council (ICC).

References

External links

1940s births
Living people
Alumni of Wesley College, Colombo
All-Ceylon cricketers
Sri Lankan cricketers